Athis fuscorubra is a moth in the Castniidae family. It is found in Trinidad, Peru, Ecuador and Venezuela. It is probably also found in the Colombian Amazonas and north-western and northern Brazil.

The length of the forewings is about 40 mm. Adults are orange brown with a darker horseshoe shaped mark on the discal area. The marginal and apical areas are lighter. Furthermore, there are four hyaline (glassy) spots of variable size found on the sub-apical area. The hindwings are reddish orange at the base, but the discal cell area is orange. There is also a dark reddish-brown extradiscal band. The lateral margin has a fringe of reddish-brown scales.

References

Moths described in 1917
Castniidae